Tereza Ana Kesovija (born 3 October 1938) is an internationally acclaimed Croatian recording artist. She was one of the most recognizable figures on the music scene in former Yugoslavia, and is renowned for her wide vocal range and operatic style. She also had a successful career in France. She has held many concerts around the world, being one of the few Yugoslav musicians to have sold out shows in The Royal Albert Hall, L'Olympia and Carnegie Hall.

Early life 
Kesovija was born in Dubrovnik and grew up in Konavle and Dubrovnik, where she got her early music education. She won a federal young musicians competition in Ljubljana, Slovenia. Afterwards, she graduated from the flute program at the Zagreb Music Academy, and as a student began appearing in amateur music events. In 1962, shortly after the start of her professional career, she won her first international contest at Saint-Vincent, Italy. After this success, Tereza had a tour in USSR and she recorded there one EP with Italian songs for the biggest Russian music company – Melodiya. She spent 1963 and 1964 touring USSR, Poland, Finland, Denmark, Germany, Switzerland, Norway and Sweden. She also had a lot of TV appearances in these countries.

Music career

France 

In 1965, she moved to France, although she did not speak French. There she became a famous star. At the beginning she was singing in cabarets; she was mostly singing in Carević cabaret. She said: "Six tough months, I used to remain in smoke until early in the morning. Waiting for my performances I didn’t know what to do. I was sitting all alone smoking cigarette after cigarette." In 1967, she made the first recording of "La chanson de Lara" (Lara's Theme) from the film Doctor Zhivago.

It was her first big French success sold out in more than 50,000 copies. After album La chanson de Lara she recorded her second French album C’est ma chanson with song "Je l'aime, je l'aime". It was sold out in more than 160,000 copies. With the song "Bien plus fort", Tereza was chosen by Grace Kelly to represent Monaco in the Eurovision 1966. She was frequently called as La bête de scène or Super-Dalida by French press. In 1968, Kesovija performed with Enrico Macias at the L'Olympia in Paris. It was her second Olympia after 1966. She had toured France.

1970s 

During the 1970s, Tereza became world-known star representing Yugoslav and French song worldwide. In Yugoslavia, her song "Nono, moj dobri Nono" (Grandpa, My Dear Grandpa) was popular. Claudio Villa recorded "Il tuo mondo", an Italian version of Tereza's "Nono" and Mireille Mathieu recorded the French version, "Pour deux coeurs qui s'aiment". She performed on many famous festivals (in Mexico City, Rio de Janeiro, Sopot, Palma de Majorca, Sofia, Istanbul etc.). In Yugoslavia, she was honored with Best Female Singer of the Year Award six years in a row (1974–79).

Her performs on Yugoslav festivals were always finished with Tereza's triumph. She won many golden records and for it, she won for several times the Yugoslav award for Best Record Seller – Golden Bird. In 1972, she represented Yugoslavia in the Eurovision Song Contest with "Muzika i ti" (The Music and You). She won ninth place and recorded a French cover, "La Musique et toi". At the beginning of the 1970s she moved from Paris to Zagreb, the capital of Croatia, and she neglected a bit her French career. In 1978, she returned to with her interpretation of "Je suis née ce jour-là".

She recorded for EMI several French records. At that time she had many tours in Russia, Egypt, Mexico, Japan, United States, Germany, Eastern Europe etc. At the end of the 70s she was at the height of her fame. All her records were awarded, she sang to Yugoslav president Josip Broz Tito and she was Tito's favourite singer. Her biggest hits from the late 1970s are "Što je ostalo od ljubavi", "Zaboravi ako možeš", "Sviraj mi, sviraj", "Sve se vraća sve se plaća", "Na Stradunu…", and others.

1980s 

During the 1980s, she continued to tour all around the world. She recorded also several records in France. She continued to win on many important Yugoslav festivals in Split, Zagreb, Belgrade etc. She was honoured with the Best Yugoslav Female Singer of the Year award for several times and she realised golden, platinum and diamond records, but the most important event was in 1988, when she performed at Olympia Hall in Paris. It was announced as the event of the season. Kesovija finished the 1980s touring in Scandinavia and representing Yugoslavia national football team on Italian TV during the World Cup.

1990s to present 

In the decade following the breakup of Yugoslavia in 1991, there were wars all over the former Yugoslavia, including the Croatian War of Independence between 1991 and 1995. She defended it with a song. She had a lot of concerts in Italy, France and Germany for collecting money to the defence of Croatia. She had some concerts in Zagreb with Serge Lama. Jacques Chirac honored Tereza in 1999 with Knighthood of High Decoration of Arts and Culture. She was also bestowed with the Golden Chart of Humanism. She started to reconstruct a house from the 18th century near Dubrovnik. It was a house of an old aristocratic family.

In the new millennium, she entered with her big hit – "I ni me stra" (And I Don't Have Any Fear). In 2002, her concert from Olympia was realized on CD edition. That 2002 is important year in her career, because she had some concerts together with Oscar and Grammy winner, Michel Legrand. They performed together superbly Les parapluies de Cherbourgh, which was announced as a concert of the year. In 2005, Kesovija celebrated 45 years of her career with a concert Mojih 45 skalina in Vatroslav Lisinski Concert Hall. Her fourth concert at the Olympia Concert Hall was realized in 2007. It was her big retour in France.

She recorded her Croatian album Zaustavi vrijeme (Stop the Time). It was third best-selling album in Croatia. After 2008 she was toured Slovenia, Macedonia, Croatia, and Bosnia and Herzegovina. In 2010, she celebrated 50 years onstage with a concert "Još se srce umorilo nije" at Zagreb's Lisinski Concert Hall. Her press conference for her first post-war concerts in Serbia was heavily covered, with more than 200 journalists. In 2011, she decided to come back in Serbia and Montenegro. She participated in charity work, which included UNESCO's gala concerts. Her discography includes 12 records released for Columbia Records, and about 30 LPs, 70 singles, and 12 CDs for other labels.

Discography 
 La Chanson de Lara (EMI, 1967)
 C´est ma chanson (EMI, 1969)
 Tereza (Jugoton, 1971)
 Tereza & Julio Iglesias Live in Bulgaria (Balkanton, 1973)
 Tereza (PGP RTB, 1974)
 Tereza & Miro Ungar (Amiga, 1974)
 Nježne strune mandoline (Jugoton, 1975)
 Stare ljubavi" (Jugoton, 1976)
 Tereza (Jugoton, 1978)
 Što je ostalo od ljubavi (Jugoton, 1978)
 Poljubi me (Jugoton, 1979)
 Moja splitska ljeta 1 (Jugoton, 1980)
 Sanjam (PGP RTB, 1981)
 Tereza (Jugoton, 1981)
 Sinoć, kad sklopih oči (ZKP RTLJ, 1982)
 Ja sam pjesma (PGP RTB, 1982)
 Prijatelji stari gdje ste (Jugoton, 1982)
 Na kušinu (PGP RTB, 1983)
 Spomenar (PGP RTB, 1983)
 Ponovni susret (PGP RTB, 1984)
 Koncert v Cankarjevem domu (RTVLj, 1984)
 Pronađi put (Jugoton, 1985)
 Bokelji i Tereza (PGP RTB, 1985)
 Molim te, ostani (Jugoton, 1986)
 Moja posljednja i prva ljubavi (Jugoton, 1987)
 Moja splitska ljeta 2 (Jugoton, 1988)
 Live `a l'Olympia (Jugoton, 1988)
 Nezaboravne melodije (Orfej RTZ, 1989)
 Ljubav je moj grijeh (Croatia Records, 1990)
 To sam ja (Tutico/Croatia Records, 1995)
 Gold Mix Tereza (Melody, 1995)
 Kad jednog dana prisjetim se svega (Croatia Records, 1997)
 Gdje ima srca tu sam i ja (Croatia Records, 1999)
 Samo malo intime (Croatia Records, 1999)
 Spomenar (compilation) (Taped Pictures, 2000)
 Ja sam pjesma (compilation) (Taped Pictures, 2001)
 Kronologija (Perfect Music/Croatia Records, 2002)
 S druge strane sna (live with Michel Legrand) (Croatia Records, 2003)
 Mojih 45 skalina (Croatia Records) (2005)
 Platinum collection (Croatia Records) (2007)
 Zaustavi vrijeme (Dallas Records)(2007)
 Live à l´Olympia (Dallas Records) (2008)
 Ja sam pjesma (PGP RTS) (2009)
 Najljepše ljubavne pjesme, Love Collection  (Croatia Records, 2012)
 Parkovi, Tereza Kesovija pjeva Alfija Kabilja (Croatia Records, 2013)
 La chanson de Lara – EP (1966/Parlophone/Warner Music France, 2014)
 Grand prix Eurovision 1966 – EP (1966/Parlophone/Warner Music France, 2014)
 Oči duše'' (Dallas Records, 2016)

References

External links 
 

1938 births
Living people
People from Dubrovnik
People from Konavle
20th-century Croatian women singers
Yugoslav women singers
Eurovision Song Contest entrants for Monaco
Eurovision Song Contest entrants for Yugoslavia
Eurovision Song Contest entrants of 1966
Eurovision Song Contest entrants of 1972
Hayat Production artists
Indexi Award winners